Seong Nak-gun (born 26 February 1962) is a South Korean sprinter. He competed in the men's 4 × 100 metres relay at the 1988 Summer Olympics.

Seong attended Busan Sports High School and was active in track and field there. He went on to Dong-a University, and while a student there represented South Korea at the 1980 Juniors Track World Championships and the 1983 Asian Athletics Championships. Along with Jang Jae-keun, Kim Jong-il, and Sim Deok-seop, he was part of the team which won bronze in the men's 4 × 100 metres relay at the 1986 Asian Games.

His brother Seong Nak-gap was also a competitive sprinter in the 1990s.

References

1962 births
Living people
Athletes (track and field) at the 1988 Summer Olympics
South Korean male sprinters
Olympic athletes of South Korea
Dong-a University alumni
Athletes (track and field) at the 1986 Asian Games
Asian Games medalists in athletics (track and field)
Place of birth missing (living people)
Asian Games bronze medalists for South Korea
Medalists at the 1986 Asian Games
20th-century South Korean people